Emiliano Garré (born 10 November 1981 in Buenos Aires, Argentina) is an Argentine former professional footballer who played as a midfielder.

Personal life
He is the second son of the Argentine coach Oscar Garré and is the brother of Argentine footballer Ezequiel Garré.

Clubs
 Huracán 1996–1998
 Campomaiorense 1999
 Huachipato 2000–2002
 Audax Italiano 2003
 Chacarita Juniors 2004–2005
 Luján 2006–2012

References
 
 

1981 births
Living people
Argentine footballers
Association football midfielders
Chacarita Juniors footballers
Club Atlético Huracán footballers
C.D. Huachipato footballers
Audax Italiano footballers
S.C. Campomaiorense players
Chilean Primera División players
Argentine Primera División players
Argentine expatriate footballers
Argentine expatriate sportspeople in Chile
Expatriate footballers in Chile
Argentine expatriate sportspeople in Portugal
Expatriate footballers in Portugal
Footballers from Buenos Aires